Theodore Christianson (September 12, 1883December 9, 1948) was an American politician who served as the 21st Governor of Minnesota from January 6, 1925, until January 6, 1931.

Early life and education
Christianson was born in Lac qui Parle Township, Minnesota. He was of Norwegian descent. He attended Dawson High School. Christianson graduated from the University of Minnesota in 1906 and the University of Minnesota Law School in 1909. He was admitted to the Minnesota State Bar in 1909.

Career 
Before entering politics, Christianson had pursued dual careers in western Minnesota, where he both practiced law and was editor and publisher of the Dawson Sentinel for fifteen years. He served as a member of the Minnesota House of Representatives for five terms.

"More Ted, Less Taxes" was the Christians's campaign slogan when he ran for governor in 1924. During his administration, he limited taxes and cut expenditures at every level of state government. He was re-elected twice.

During his tenure as governor, Christianson established a three-member Commission of Administration and Finance. This so-called "Big Three" unleashed the veto power of the chief executive, who slashed budget appropriations he considered extravagant.

Christianson was a candidate for the 1930 United States Senate election in Minnesota, placing second in the Republican primary after incumbent Senator Thomas Schall. During a three-year hiatus from politics, Christianson wrote five-volume history text called The Land of Sky-Tinted Waters: A History of the State and its People. He was elected to the United States House of Representatives in 1932 and served until 1937. In 1936, he did not run for re-election to the House, opting to launch another bid for the Senate in the 1936 election. Receiving the Republican nomination, he ran against former congressman Ernest Lundeen of the Farmer Labor Party and was defeated, receiving 37% of the vote.

After leaving politics, Christianson moved to Chicago and served as secretary-manager of the National Association of Retail Grocers from 1937 to 1939. He was public relations counsel for the National Association of Retail Druggists from 1938 to 1945, and editor of The Journal of the National Association of Retail Druggists: Official Organ of the N.A.R.D. from 1945 to 1948.

Personal life
His son was Theodore Christianson who served on the Minnesota Supreme Court.

Christianson had recently retired to Dawson, Minnesota, when he died of a heart attack at 65. He is interred at Sunset Memorial Park Cemetery in Minneapolis, Minnesota.

References

Other sources
Biographical information
 Gubernatorial records
Minnesota Historical Society
Minnesota Legislators Past and Present

1883 births
1948 deaths
People from Lac qui Parle County, Minnesota
Republican Party governors of Minnesota
20th-century American newspaper publishers (people)
American Presbyterians
Historians of Minnesota
Republican Party members of the Minnesota House of Representatives
University of Minnesota Law School alumni
American people of Norwegian descent
Republican Party members of the United States House of Representatives from Minnesota
20th-century American politicians
Historians from Minnesota